Suburban trains in Budapest are known in Hungarian as Budapesti elővárosi vonatok, serving fourteen lines in the Budapest metropolitan area, three of which are part of the BHÉV system. The system is operated by Hungarian State Railways.

Services

The HÉV lines are indicated by a H letter followed by a number. H5 terminates at Szentendre, H6 at Ráckeve, H8 at Gödöllő and 9 at Csömör. H7 does not cross the administrative boundary of Budapest. The numbering was introduced in 2011, continuing with the numbering of the existing M4 subway line.

From 15 December 2013, suburban trains departing from the Budapest-Déli Railway Terminal were piloted, and from 14 December 2014 all suburban trains received numbered services. 

Trains that stop at every station are designated as S (similar to numerous S-train services), trains making fewer stops are designated as G, and express trains are designated as Z.

Lines
The following services are operated.

Future developments
Plans exist to build a cross-city tunnel linking Déli station with Nyugati station to provide through services between the two.

References

Transport in Budapest
Rapid transit in Hungary
Regional rail in Hungary
Railway companies of Hungary